The Brady Memorial Chapel is a historic chapel in Mountain View Cemetery in Pocatello, Idaho.

It was designed by architect Frank Paradice, Jr., was built during 1918 to 1922, and was added to the National Register in 1979.

The chapel includes a tomb of the late Idaho governor and U.S. senator James H. Brady.

References

Properties of religious function on the National Register of Historic Places in Idaho
Gothic Revival church buildings in Idaho
Churches completed in 1918
Churches in Bannock County, Idaho
1918 establishments in Idaho
National Register of Historic Places in Bannock County, Idaho